Arvi is an Estonian and Finnish male given name.

People named Arvi include:
 Arvi Aavik (born 1969), Estonian wrestler 
 Arvi Grotenfelt (1863–1941), Finnish philosopher and psychologist
 Arvi Hurskainen (born 1941), Finnish scholar of language technology and linguistics
 Arvi Kalsta (1890–1982), Finnish National Socialist 
 Arvi Kontu (1883–1945), Finnish agronomist and politician 
 Arvi Lind (born 1940), Finnish television news presenter
 Arvi Mägi (born 1949), Estonian actor and theatre director
 Arvi Malmivaara (1885–1970), Finnish Lutheran clergyman and politician
 Arvi Parbo (born 1926), Estonian-Australian business executive
 Arvi Pohjanpää (1887–1959), Finnish artistic gymnast
 Arvi Savolainen (born 1998), Finnish Greco-Roman wrestler
 Arvi Siig (1938–1999), Estonian poet, translator and journalist
 Arvi Tervalampi (1928–2005), Finnish equestrian
 Arvi Turkka (1894–1965), Finnish journalist and politician

References

Estonian masculine given names
Finnish masculine given names